Omanthai Central College ( Ōmantai Mattiya Kallūri) is a provincial school in Omanthai, Sri Lanka.

See also
 List of schools in Northern Province, Sri Lanka

References

External links
 Omanthai Central College

Educational institutions established in 1911
Provincial schools in Sri Lanka
Schools in Vavuniya District
Omanthai
1911 establishments in Ceylon